Theromaster is a genus of armoured harvestmen in the family Cladonychiidae. There are at least two described species in Theromaster, found in the eastern United States.

Species
These two species belong to the genus Theromaster:
 Theromaster archeri (Goodnight & Goodnight, 1942)
 Theromaster brunneus (Banks, 1902)

References

Further reading

 
 
 
 

Harvestmen